Arnos Court Triumphal Arch is an 18th-century monument in Junction Road, Brislington, Bristol, England.

Description 
The arch was built around 1760 by James Bridges, for William Reeve, a prominent local Quaker and businessman. It is built from Bath stone, of classical proportions but with Gothic and Moorish detail.

In its current position, next to the main A4 road, it marked the entrance to the (since demolished) Arnos Court Bath House. A plaque on the arch states that it was moved from its original position, at the entrance to the Black Castle, in 1912 and was fully renovated in 1995.

The arch was designated as Grade II* listed in 1959.

Carvings 

The niches on each side of the arch once contained carvings from the demolished City Gates. The rear elevation is much simpler than the front, and includes a carving of the City's coat of arms.

The four statues which decorate the archway are 20th-century copies of 13th- and 14th-century originals. The original statues of King Edward I and King Edward III were set in one of the deep niches on the western side that have tent-like canopies. The original statues were taken from Bristol's Lawford's Gate that was demolished around the time of construction of the arch. Those on the east-side are 13th-century figures from Bristol's Newgate, representing Robert, the builder of Bristol Castle, and Geoffrey de Montbray, bishop of Coutances, builder of the fortified walls of Bristol. The originals of all four were removed due to their deteriorating condition in 1898 and they are now in the St Nicholas's Church Museum.

See also
 Grade II* listed buildings in Bristol

References

Grade II* listed buildings in Bristol
Triumphal arches in the United Kingdom
Monuments and memorials in Bristol
Buildings and structures completed in 1760
Grade II* listed monuments and memorials